is a passenger railway station in the town of Kudoyama, Ito District, Wakayama Prefecture, Japan, operated by the private railway company Nankai Electric Railway.

Lines
Kōyashita Station is served by the Nankai Kōya Line, and is located 54.2 kilometers from the terminus of the line at Shiomibashi Station and 53.5 kilometers from Namba Station.

Station layout
The station consists of two opposed side platforms connected to the station building by a level crossing.  third side platform, formerly used for freight operations, remains in situ but is no longer in use. The station is unattended.

Platforms

Adjacent stations

History
It was renamed to its present name on September 11 of the same year. The Nankai Railway was merged into the Kintetsu group in 1944 by orders of the Japanese government, and reemerged as the Nankai Railway Company in 1947.

Passenger statistics
In fiscal 2019, the station was used by an average of 86 passengers daily (boarding passengers only).

Surrounding area
 Japan National Route 370
Shiidegenshima Shrine

See also
List of railway stations in Japan

References

External links

 Kōyashita Station Official Site

Railway stations in Japan opened in 1925
Railway stations in Wakayama Prefecture
Kudoyama, Wakayama